Julie Johnston (married name Ertz) is an American association football player.

Julie Johnston may also refer to:
 Julie Johnston (writer), winner of Governor General's Award for English-language children's literature
 Julie Johnston (Bad Girls), a character in Bad Girls

See also
Julie Johnson (disambiguation)